Brigadier General James Francis McIndoe (January 18, 1868 – February 5, 1919) was a senior officer of the United States Army. He was involved in conflicts in the Philippines and World War I, where he commanded the 2nd Engineers on the Western Front.

Military career
James F. McIndoe was born in Lonaconing, Maryland 18 January 1868. He graduated from the United States Military Academy in 1891. Among his classmates included several future general officers, such as Andrew Hero Jr., John W. Heavey, Hanson Edward Ely, Edwin B. Winans and John Jewsbury Bradley. He joined the U.S. Engineer School and became second lieutenant with the Corps of Engineers in 1895. During the Spanish–American War in 1898 McIndoe was responsible for submarine defences in New York Harbor.

After his promotion to captain, he had assignments as an instructor and helped with harbour improvements in the US. In 1914 he was stationed in the Philippines. After his return to the United States, he became lieutenant-colonel with the 2nd Regiment of engineers in 1917.

In late 1917, when the United States joined World War I, McIndoe got a temporary promotion to colonel and commanded the 2nd engineers as part of the American Expeditionary Forces. After assignments for preparing training areas for the US troops in France, he became Chief Engineer of the 4th Corps. He took part in the battles around Château-Thierry and was promoted to brigadier general in October 1918. He was appointed as Director of Military Engineering and Engineering Supplies, a position which he held until his death.

James F. McIndoe died of lobar pneumonia on 6 February 1919, almost three months after the Armistice with Germany, in Bazoilles-sur-Meuse, France.

References

External links

"James Francis McIndoe" - DSM citation on valor.militarytimes.com

1868 births
1919 deaths
United States Army generals of World War I
United States Military Academy alumni
Recipients of the Distinguished Service Medal (US Army)
People from Lonaconing, Maryland
United States Army generals
Deaths from pneumonia in France
American military personnel of the Spanish–American War
United States Army Corps of Engineers personnel
Military personnel from Maryland